The Netherlands Wind Ensemble comprises musicians from all the major Dutch symphony orchestras.

The NBE is regularly featured in special concert series at Amsterdam’s main venues: the Concertgebouw, Paradiso and the new Muziekgebouw aan 't IJ. The NBE also tours abroad, twice per season on average. The artistic leader of the ensemble is oboist Bart Schneemann.

History
The ensemble was founded in 1959 by Thom de Klerk (1912–1966), principal bassoonist of the Concertgebouw Orchestra who had formed a student wind quintet at the Amsterdam Conservatory (Martine Bakker (flute), Edo de Waart (oboe), George Pieterson (clarinet), Joep Terwey (bassoon) and Jaap Verhaar (horn)). De Klerk wanted to expand the group in order to perform wind serenades like those by Mozart, Dvorak and Gounod, and aimed to make the ensemble into the "I Musici" for winds. The core of the NBE was a wind octet (pairs of oboes, clarinets, bassoons, and horns), but the ensemble usually expanded to larger dimensions. When De Klerk died in October 1966, Edo de Waart, who had left in 1962 to focus on conducting, took over his role (Han de Vries and Werner Herbers played oboe since the expansion). In this period, the ensemble made many recordings and multiple composers wrote music for the group. Both De Waart and De Vries left in 1975. The NBE adjusted to play without a conductor, while Joep Terwey and Werner Herbers acted as managers. From 1985 to 1988 Nikolaus Harnoncourt joined as conductor. In 1988, the NBE reorganized with many younger players and Bart Schneemann (a student of Han de Vries) taking over the artistic management.

Programs 
In the past years, the NBE has created and performed a substantial number of original programs focusing on a particular composer or soloist. Kevin Volans, Roger Doyle, Alexander Raskatov, Carmen Linares, Guido Morini, Luca Francesconi, Cornelis de Bondt, Theo Loevendie, Guus Janssen, John Psathas, Maarten Altena, Martijn Padding, Ayub Ogada, Iva Bittova, the Pokrovsky Ensemble, the Hilliard Ensemble, Jordi Savall, Marco Beasley, Aynur Dogan and Manos Akhalinotopoulos have all been featured in this way.

In addition, the NBE regularly stages programs like Mail from Mozart, which alternates the seven parts of Mozart’s ‘Gran Partita’ with readings from his letters to his father; Schumann’s Diary, which tells the story of Schumann’s deteriorating mental health through passages from his diary and new interpretations of his piano works by Dutch composer Otto Ketting; or The Creation, which takes, as its point of departure, an 18th century version of Joseph Haydn’s Die Schöpfung but frames it with an updated Creation myth by Flemish author Bart Moeyaert.

Around the Mozart year 2006, the NBE staged Le Nozze di Figaro, Die Zauberflöte and Cosi fan Tutte as a trio of original chamber operas performed on period instruments and featuring the voices of soprano Johannette Zomer and baritone Frans Fiselier.

Finally, there is the traditional New Year’s Concert, started in 1972 and since 1995 broadcast live on television from the Concertgebouw in Amsterdam.

CDs 

The NBE has recorded CDs for two major international labels: Philips and Britain’s Chandos. In November 1999, the NBE started its own record label, NBELIVE, which releases two or three live recordings of special NBE projects per year. In 2007 the NBELIVE CD Gran Partita, a live recording of Mozart's serenade for winds, received an Edison Award.

External links
 Netherlands Wind Ensemble official website
 Joep Terwey, The History of the Netherlands Wind Ensemble, SCRAPES International, Vol. 1, 1998, pp. 40-44.
 Robert Adelson [ Allmusic.com "biography"] of the ensemble.

Chamber music groups
Dutch culture
Dutch orchestras
Instrumental musical groups
1959 establishments in the Netherlands
Musical groups established in 1959
Woodwind musicians